The British Rail Class 91 is a high-speed electric locomotive, which produces power of ; it was ordered as a component of the East Coast Main Line modernisation and electrification programme of the late 1980s.

The locomotive body shells are of all-steel construction. Unusually, the motors are body mounted and drive bogie-mounted gearboxes via cardan shafts; this reduces the unsprung mass and hence track wear at high speeds. The locomotive also features an underslung transformer, therefore the body is relatively empty compared to contemporary electric locomotives. Much of the engineering specification for the locomotive was derived from the research and operational experience of the APT-P.

The other end of the InterCity 225 train set is formed of a Mark 4 Driving Van Trailer, built with a similar body shell to the Class 91 locomotives but with only one driving cab.

History

Background
The origins of the Class 91 are closely associated with the East Coast Main Line (ECML) that it has been primarily operated upon. During the 1950s, British Rail had considered electrification of the ECML to be of equal importance to the West Coast Main Line (WCML), but various political factors led to the envisioned electrification programme being delayed for decades; as an alternative, high-speed diesel traction, the Deltic and then the InterCity 125, was introduced upon the route during the 1960s and 1970s. During the 1970s, a working group of British Rail and Department of Transport officials determined that, out of all options for further electrification, the ECML represented the best value by far. Its in-house forecasts determined that increases in revenue and considerable reductions in energy and maintenance costs would occur by electrifying the line.

Accordingly, between 1976 and 1991, the ECML was electrified with  overhead lines. In 1984, the second phase commenced to electrify the northern section to Edinburgh and Leeds.

In 1989 the InterCity 225 was officially introduced to revenue service. That same year, the ECML had been energised through to York; two years later, electrification had reached Edinburgh, allowing electric services to begin on 8 July 1991, eight weeks later than scheduled. The ECML electrification programme was completed at a cost of £344.4million (at 1983 prices), a minor overrun against its authorised expenditure of £331.9million. 40 per cent of the total cost was on new traction and rolling stock and 60 per cent for the electrification of the line.

Options and selection
The electrification of the ECML necessitated the procurement of new high speed electric traction. The options and requirements for this trainset were hotly deliberated for a number of years. On 7 June 1978, the electric-powered prototype Advanced Passenger Train (APT) was unveiled; it was at one point intended for the APT to be the next major intercity express train. However, due to various factors including technical issues, the APT programme was curtailed during the summer of 1983. Shortly thereafter, two alternative options were explored, an electrified version of the InterCity 125 (known as the HST-E), and the  mixed-traffic locomotive; these were both intended to a peak service speed of 125mph.

Some officials within British Rail pushed for more demanding requirements for the future Intercity trainset; reportedly, BR's Director of Mechanical and Electrical Engineering (M&EE) was a strong proponent for increasing the top speed to 140 mph. To facilitate this, tilting train technologies developed for the APT were explored. While BR's board had approved the ordering of a single Class 89 as a prototype, the Strategy Committee queried why the type had been favoured over a proposed 80-tonne Bo-Bo locomotive. While the Class 89 was thought to be a low-risk option for multi-purpose traction, it offered little advantage over the existing  in terms of speed. At the time, the 1950s era  and  electric locomotives were nearing the end of their viable service lives and were quite unreliable, but their withdrawal had effectively been ruled out by a national shortage of newer electric traction, in part caused by the APT's cancellation.

A key advantage of the InterCity 225 concept over a Class 89-hauled consist was the lower weight of the former, resulting in less slippage and greater acceleration over the latter. Appraisals also determined that the Class 89 was comparatively inferior in financial terms, in part due to the InterCity 225's prospective compatibility with WCML traction, reducing its development costs. A further cost-saving measure was the decision to base the InterCity 225's technologies on the APT. BR reportedly stated that it had derived 90% of the former's engineering from the latter. Thus, the study group recommended that the InterCity 225 be pursued as the preferred option, while the Class 89 and HST-E initiatives serve as back-ups. Despite this, the HST-E effort was promptly aborted, while Brush Traction decided to de-prioritise work on the Class 89 after learning that it was unlikely to lead to volume production.

By spring 1984, favour was being given towards the adoption of a tilting carriage, tentatively designated as the Mk 4; this was viewed as superior to the existing Mk 3 and enabled a single design to be shared between the ECML and WCML. At one point, it was envisaged that the InterCity 225 would be extremely ubiquitous, even potentially having the capability built into it to operate over the southern third-rail network and within the Channel Tunnel; by mid 1984, such fanciful ideas were curtailed. Furthermore, it was decided to reduce the freight haulage capabilities of the InterCity 225, as traction for this sector was instead intended to be served via other platforms. Without tilting carriages, it had little speed advantage over the Class 90 on the WCML.

It was decided to hold a competitive tender for the InterCity 225 programme; this measure was aimed at avoiding the difficulties experienced with the APT programme. A pre-qualification document was formalised, in which various requirements for the type were laid out; these included the need to perform mixed-traffic duties (day and night passenger, parcel and mail, and overnight heavy freight services), the haulage of both tilting and conventional rolling stock, a top speed of 225km/h, a maximum cant deficiency of 9° without the provision of tilt equipment, and that the maximum unsprung mass could not exceed 1.8tonnes. Furthermore, BR stated its readiness to sub-contract with the successful bidder for the supply of technical information, advice and testing. The prequalification document was issued to BREL, Brush Traction and the General Electric Company (GEC), as well as the French firm Alsthom and Germany's Krauss Maffei. The inclusion of foreign manufacturers was in part due to the limited domestic experience with trainsets capable of such high top speeds. A total of three companies, ASEA, Brush Traction and GEC, submitted tenders for the design and construction of the Class 91 locomotive.

On 14 February 1985, the BR board approved the substitution of the Class 91 for Class 89 for the ECML programme. The tendering process was relatively complex, but a decisive move appeared to have been GEC's offer of a sub-contracting arrangement to BREL for the construction of the locomotive's mechanical elements. It would be GEC's submission that would be selected as the winner; after which a contract for the construction of 31 Class 91 locomotives, along with an option for 25 more for the WCML, was awarded during February 1986. Shortly thereafter, BREL established a production line for the type at its Crewe Works.

Post-introduction developments
The first passenger service to be operated by a Class 91 locomotive was the 17:36 King's Cross to Peterborough on 3 March 1989. From 6 March, members of the fleet began to work services between London and Grantham, and from 11 March services between London and Leeds. With the completion of the East Coast Main Line electrification programme, Class 91 trains reached Newcastle upon Tyne for the first time in service on 10 June 1991, then Edinburgh on 12 June.

In service, as a part of the InterCity 225 sets, the fleet worked alongside  locomotives and  electric multiple units. Diesel trains displaced by the Class 91 introduction were reallocated predominantly to the Midland Main Line. The InterCity 225's introduction correlated with a significant increase in passenger numbers using the ECML within two years; one station recorded a 58 per cent increase in passengers.

In the early 1990s, after the cancellation of InterCity 250, British Rail examined the option of ordering a further set of ten Class 91s to operate on the West Coast Main Line with UK Treasury support, however the business case for these failed to prove sufficiently worthwhile. and led to the electric Networker Classes 365, 465 and 466 EMU Networker stock's procurement being taken forward.

The locomotive body is asymmetric; streamlined at the 'front' (Number 1) end , but left 'blunt' at the Number 2 end so as to visually blend with the fixed sets of Mark 4 coaches in normal push-pull passenger service. Because of a design requirement that the class be able to function as normal locomotives if so required, a full driver's cab is also provided at the Number 2 endbut the locomotive's maximum speed is reduced to  when this cab is at the front of a train.

During the privatisation of British Rail ownership of the Class 91 fleet passed to Eversholt Rail Group, which in turn leased the fleet to its various operators. Eversholt put all 31 locomotives through a £30million heavy overhaul and refit process between 2000 and 2003, seeking to improve the fleet's reliability. Rail Magazine described it in March 2001 as being necessary because "eight out of ten failures on Class 91s were caused by the sub-standard electrics", and further noted that problems with relays in particular were the "third-biggest" cause of failures. The refit was performed by Adtranz (later Bombardier Transportation), with technical support from Alstom, and involved upgrades to the bogies, electrical systems, air compressors, and parking brakes; alterations to the cab layout at the Number 1 end; the replacement of the original gearboxes with newly designed Voith models; and the installation of TPWS and a new air-cooling system. Overhauled units had their numbers increased by 100; thus 91001 became 91101 and so onwith the exception of 91023, which was renumbered 91132 due to sensitivity around its involvement in both the Hatfield and Selby accidents.

During the overhaul process, GNER hired in Class 90 locomotives to provide cover for their services.

In November 2012, number 91114 had a second pantograph added as a pilot project conducted jointly by Eversholt, East Coast, DB ESG, Wabtec, and Brecknell Willis. The new design uses the same mounting positions as a conventional pantograph but pairs two pantograph arms in an opposing configuration. If there is an ADD (Automatic Dropping Device) activation or the pantograph becomes detached, the train can keep going, so the system provides redundancy in the event of a pantograph/OLE failure.

Speed records
Locomotive 91010 (now 91110) holds the British speed record for electric locomotives, reaching  while on a test run down the East Coast Main Line's Stoke Bank on 17 September 1989.

Despite these successes, however, Class 91 locomotives have never used their 140mph top speed in regular service, because testing conducted by British Rail in 1988 established that drivers could not interpret and act upon line-side signal aspects with sufficient consistency and accuracy when driving at speeds exceeding . Regulations throughout Britain were subsequently amended to require the use of in-cab signalling whenever running service trains at speeds above 125mph, an option that BR were unwilling to pursue at the time.

Fleet 

When British Rail was privatised, the InterCity livery was progressively removed and new operator GNER applied their corporate livery of blue and red. When GNER lost their franchise in 2007, the red stripe was replaced by a white stripe containing the words National Express and East Coast. National Express East Coast originally planned to repaint all of their InterCity 225 sets in the white and silver NXEC corporate livery within two years. However, the collapse of NXEC in 2009 and its replacement with East Coast saw this repainting programme cancelled. As a result, 91111 was the only locomotive to receive the full National Express livery.

In June 2010, a new silver livery with a purple stripe was unveiled by East Coast. By February 2011, locomotives 91101, 91106, 91107 and 91109 carried this livery. Locomotive 91101 was soon given maroon vinyls, with Flying Scotsman branding. Locomotive 91107 was given promotional "Skyfall" vinyls for a time during 2012–3. The locomotive later returned to conventional Virgin Trains East Coast livery. Locomotive 91110 carries 'BBMF' Battle Of Britain Memorial Flight livery. By 2013, all locomotives carried the standard East Coast livery of silver/grey with a purple stripe. 91118 was the last locomotive to carry GNER/NXEC livery. All Mark 4 coaches and DVTs have since been repainted. On 14 October 2014, at Newcastle station, locomotive 91111 was unveiled in a commemorative World War I livery and named 'For The Fallen'.

The Class 91 fleet has carried nameplates applied in various batches and themes. Immediately after repainting into GNER colours in the late 1990s, all locomotives were briefly nameless. Having initially been applied to only a few locomotives in the early 1990s using cast-iron plates, eventually the whole fleet was named, many multiple times, until all were removed in 2008. In 2011, in response to customer requests, East Coast resumed the practice. It began by naming No. 91109 as Sir Bobby Robson with cast-iron plates, unveiled in a ceremony at Newcastle station on 29 March by his widow Elsie and Alan Shearer.

List of Class 91 locomotives

Operators

Current operations
The fleet, which was previously operated by InterCity and then GNER, National Express East Coast, East Coast and Virgin Trains East Coast, is currently run by London North Eastern Railway.

In July 2019, 91108 was the first of the class to be withdrawn. Following the withdrawal of the InterCity 125 fleet in December 2019, it was previously thought that the InterCity 225 fleet would be fully withdrawn by June 2020. However, LNER announced on 29 January 2020 that they would be retaining a limited number of the InterCity 225 fleet to deliver all of the benefits of their December 2021 timetable. LNER later confirmed that they would be keeping 10 sets in service.

In September 2020, Eversholt Rail Group and London North Eastern Railway extended their lease to ten by 2023. In addition, there are options to make it operational until 2024. It will be overhauled at the Wabtec Doncaster plant.

At the end of service on 15 January 2021, the remaining serviceable InterCity 225 sets went into storage temporarily as part of the East Coast Upgrade. Originally, the plan was to return the sets to service for 7 June 2021, but instead the first set re-entered service on 11 May 2021 due to a number of Azuma sets having to be taken out of service.

Future operations
Europhoenix purchased 91117 and 91120 in September 2019. They were repainted at Bounds Green TMD before moving to UK Rail Leasing's Leicester depot. They are to be re-geared for freight operation in Europe. In September 2022, 91120 moved to Crewe Heritage Centre on long-term loan from Europhoenix.

The company has also expressed interest in using the Class 91s on high speed logistics trains.

Grand Union is proposing to operate InterCity 225s on London Paddington to Cardiff Central and London Euston to Stirling services.

Withdrawal 
Class 91 number 91132 was the first Class 91 to be officially scrapped. It was scrapped at Sims Metals Scrapyard in Nottingham.

Preservation 
Upon retirement, 91110, 91111, and 91131 will be preserved as part of the National Collection, having all been nominated by the Railway Heritage Committee.

In June 2021, the '225 Group' was launched; a preservation initiative with the intention of preserving a further Class 91 and an Intercity 225 set.

In September 2022, Crewe Heritage Centre received 91120 on long-term loan from Europheonix.

In January 2023, 91131 is due to move to the Museum of Scottish Railways at the Bo'ness and Kinneil Railway.

Notes

References

Literature

External links 

 
 

Bo-Bo locomotives
BREL locomotives
91
25 kV AC locomotives
Railway locomotives introduced in 1988
High-speed trains of the United Kingdom
GEC locomotives
East Coast Main Line
Standard gauge locomotives of Great Britain